The 2013 TVB Star Awards Malaysia, presented by TVB Entertainment News, Astro, and MY FM in Malaysia, was an awards ceremony that recognised the best Hong Kong television programmes that had aired on Malaysia's Astro Wah Lai Toi in 2013. It replaced the My AOD Favourites Awards.

The ceremony took place on 1 December 2013 at the Star Stage@KWC in Kuala Lumpur, Malaysia. It aired live on Malaysia's Astro Wah Lai Toi and Hong Kong's TVB Entertainment News channel.

Winners and nominees
Winners are listed first, highlighted in boldface. The top five nominees are also highlighted in boldface.

Programs

Acting and hosting
Winners are listed first, highlighted in boldface. The top five nominees are also highlighted in boldface.

References

TVB original programming
2013 television awards
2013 in Hong Kong television

zh:TVB 马来西亚星光荟萃颁奖典礼2013